Vincenzo Tommasini (17 September 187823 December 1950) was an Italian composer.

Born in Rome, Tommasini studied philology and the Greek language at the University of Rome, at the same time pursuing equally intensive studies in music at the Academy of St. Cecilia.  In 1902 he traveled extensively throughout Europe; during this time he studied under Max Bruch in Berlin.  He first achieved note with a one-act opera, Uguale fortuna, which won a national competition.  His biggest success internationally was his 1916 arrangement of keyboard sonatas by Domenico Scarlatti for the Sergei Diaghilev ballet in The Good-Humoured Ladies (Le donne di buon umore).   It was he and Arturo Toscanini who completed Arrigo Boito's unfinished opera Nerone.

Tommasini was a leading figure in the revival of orchestral music in twentieth-century Italy.  Among his other works are Paesaggi toscani (Tuscan Landscapes) for orchestra and a set of variations, also for orchestra, on the Carnival of Venice.

Selected filmography
 A Pistol Shot (1942)

External links

References

Guido M. Gatti (Nov. 1, 1921). Some Italian Composers of To-Day. VIII. Vincenzo Tommasini. The Musical Times, Vol. 62, No. 945, pp. 767–770.
Staff report (December 25, 1950). VINCENZO TOMMASINI, COMPOSER OF OPERAS. New York Times
David Ewen, Encyclopedia of Concert Music.  New York; Hill and Wang, 1959.

1878 births
1950 deaths
Italian classical composers
Italian male classical composers
Italian opera composers
Male opera composers
Musicians from Rome
Sapienza University of Rome alumni
20th-century classical composers
20th-century Italian composers
20th-century Italian male musicians